Good Monsters is the seventh full-length studio album from Jars of Clay, released by Essential Records on September 5, 2006. This is their last album of new material from Essential Records and it is said to be lyrically their most aggressive album to date. It features eleven original songs, and a remake of "All My Tears" by Julie Miller. It also features guest appearances by singer/songwriter Kate York (on "Even Angels Cry"), Leigh Nash, of Sixpence None the Richer (on "Mirrors & Smoke"), and the African Children's Choir (on "Light Gives Heat").

"Dead Man (Carry Me)", the first single from the album, was released to radio stations on June 23, 2006. "Work" was released as the second single, along with its music video, in late August. The band also released a music video for the album track "Good Monsters". In the September 2006 edition of CCM Magazine, the band credited fellow artist Ashley Cleveland with inspiring the improvisational sound of the album.

In an editor's fall albums overview in CCM Magazine, Good Monsters was called, "the album that Jars of Clay will be remembered for." It ended up taking the award for the CCM Magazine staff picks as album of the year, winning four out of the five spaces.

Overview
Concerning the album's title and themes, Dan Haseltine explains, "I was not sure how all of the experiences of the last few years would translate into music. There have been so many things to look at and describe. This record is part confessional, part euphoric love poem, bitter separation and part benediction. It was born out of many experiences and conversations between addicts, failures, lovers, loners, believers, and beggars. And so the language of recovery and the honest discourse about our attempts to live apart from God and apart from each other is a theme. Engaging people who are doing the hard work of laying their lives open to others, and avoiding isolation, has allowed me to see that there is both immeasurable evil and unfathomable good mixing under my own skin and it is grace, mercy and freedom that allow me to not simply be a monster, but to be a good monster."

Track listing
Note: All songs written by Dan Haseltine, Charlie Lowell, Stephen Mason, and Matt Odmark unless otherwise noted

Standard release
"Work" – 3:53
"Dead Man (Carry Me)" – 3:20
"All My Tears" (Julie Miller) – 3:45
"Even Angels Cry" – 4:22
"There Is a River" (Haseltine, Lowell, Mason, Odmark, Ron Aniello) – 3:51
"Good Monsters" – 4:05
"Oh My God" – 6:06
"Surprise" – 3:50
"Take Me Higher" (Haseltine, Lowell, Mason, Odmark, Aniello) – 4:40
"Mirrors & Smoke" – 3:58
"Light Gives Heat" – 4:42
"Water Under the Bridge" (Haseltine, Lowell, Mason, Odmark, Aniello) – 3:58

iTunes pre-release track listing
"Work" – 3:53
"Dead Man (Carry Me)" – 3:20
"All My Tears" – 3:45
"Even Angels Cry" – 4:22
"There Is a River" – 3:51
"Good Monsters" – 4:05
"Oh My God" – 6:06
"Surprise" – 3:50
"Take Me Higher" – 4:40
"Mirrors & Smoke" – 3:58
"Light Gives Heat" – 4:42
"Water Under the Bridge" – 3:58
"Work" (acoustic version) – 3:36

Personnel 
Jars of Clay
 Dan Haseltine
 Charlie Lowell
 Stephen Mason
 Matt Odmark

Additional musicians

 Aaron Sands – bass
 Jeremy Lutito – drums
 Erin Horner – French horn
 Jennifer Kummer – French horn
 John Catchings – cello (12)
 Kristin Wilkinson – viola
 Jonathan Beach – violin 
 Ned Henry – violin (8)
 Christopher Davis – horn and string arrangements
 Rosemary Butler – additional vocals (3, 9)
 Ashley Cleveland – additional vocals (3, 9)
 Kim Fleming – additional vocals (3, 9)
 Kate York – additional vocals (4)
 Leigh Nash – additional vocals (10)
 African Children's Choir – additional vocals (11)
 Elizabeth Panga – soloist 

Production

 Terry Hemmings – executive producer
 Jars of Clay – producers, art direction
 Mitch Dane – recording 
 Vance Powell – recording, mixing (3, 4, 6-12)
 Allen Ditto – recording assistant, mix assistant (3, 4, 7-12)
 Will James – recording assistant, mix assistant (3, 4, 7-12)
 Mike Odmark – recording assistant 
 David Robinson – recording assistant
 Chris Lord-Alge – mixing (1, 5)
 Jay Ruston – mixing (2, 6)
 Keith Armstrong – mix assistant (1, 5)
 Dim-E – mix assistant (1, 5)
 Seth Morton – mix assistant (3, 4, 7-12)
 Nathan Yarborough – mix assistant (3, 4, 7-12)
 Richard Dodd – mastering at RichardDodd.com, Nashville, Tennessee
 Conor Farley – A&R coordinator 
 Michelle Pearson – A&R production 
 Tim Parker – art direction
 Jonathan Richter – art direction, cover design, packaging design 
 Wolf Hoffman – photography 
 Star Klem – stylist 
 Robin Geary – hair, make-up 
 Blackbird Studios, Nashville, Tennessee – recording studio
 Sputnik Sound, Nashville, Tennessee – recording studio
 Blackbird Studios, Sherman Oaks, California – mixing location
 TRS West, Sherman Oaks, California – mixing location
 Resonate Music, Burbank, California – mixing location

Honors 
 CCM Magazine named Good Monsters its  Album of the Year shortly after its September release, unusually early for such a distinction. Editor Jay Swartzendruber declared it "the landmark album of 2006." He noted that all six members of CCM's editorial team agreed on the selection and that it was "the most profound album the Christian music community has released in years."
Good Monsters was Christianity Today'''s No. 1 album of 2006, and ranked No. 5 of New Release Tuesday's top 10 albums of 2006.Good Monsters'' won the Best Rock/Contemporary Album of the Year at the GMA Dove Awards of 2007 held at the Grand Ole Opry House in Nashville.
The album peaked at No. 58 on the Billboard 200. More than 15,000 copies were sold in its first week.

Notes

External links
 Good Monsters album site
 Interview: 60 Seconds with Jars of Clay
 Interview: The Monster Within
 Interview: "Oh My God" by Jars Of Clay (September 16, 2008)

2006 albums
Jars of Clay albums
Essential Records (Christian) albums